Paul Palmieri may refer to:
Paul Palmieri (Bickertonite) (1933–2020), president of The Church of Jesus Christ (Bickertonite)
Paul Palmieri (CEO) (born 1970), chief executive officer of Millennial Media